C. ehrenbergii may refer to:

 Canna ehrenbergii, a garden plant
 Chlidanthus ehrenbergii, a South American plant
 Chlosyne ehrenbergii, a Mexican butterfly
 Closterium ehrenbergii, a cylindrical algae
 Croton ehrenbergii, a medicinal plant
 Cylindrocarpon ehrenbergii, a plant pathogen

See also

 C. ehrenbergi (disambiguation)